Casino Magic Corp. was a gaming company based in Bay St. Louis, Mississippi. It was acquired in 1998 by Hollywood Park, Inc. (now Pinnacle Entertainment) for $340 million, snubbing an offer of $310 million from Grand Casinos.

List of properties
Casino Magic Bay St. Louis — Bay St. Louis, Mississippi
Casino Magic Biloxi — Biloxi, Mississippi
Casino Magic Bossier City — Bossier City, Louisiana
Casino Magic Neuquén — Neuquén, Argentina
Casino Magic San Martín de los Andes — San Martín de los Andes, Argentina

References

Defunct gambling companies
Gambling companies of the United States
Defunct companies based in Mississippi